The National Forensic Association (NFA) is an American intercollegiate organization designed to promote excellence in individual events and debate.  The NFA sponsors the NFA Nationals as well many other regional tournaments throughout the year.  The 2016 NFA national tournament will be hosted by Ball State University, Muncie, Indiana.  Founded in 1971, the NFA Nationals is the oldest national collegiate tournament dedicated to a full range of literature interpretation, public address, limited preparation, and debate events.

Lincoln Douglas Debate
NFA is unique in its NFA-LD Policy format. High school debate is primarily divided into individual debaters engaged in values-oriented competition or teams of debaters in rapid-paced evidence-based policy analysis.  Instead of choosing one of these formats, NFA offers evidence-based policy analysis in one-on-one competition.

LD Policy Format
At the beginning of each year a topic area and corresponding resolution is voted upon and subject to the entire season's debate.  Each round competitors find themselves assigned to affirm or negate the resolution.  Rather than affirm general ideas or values, affirmative competitors propose a particular policy to adopt as a representation of the resolution.  Negative competitors will generally attempt to either demonstrate a lack of need for that policy or argue that said policy's disadvantages outweigh its benefits.

The first affirmative and negative speeches are constructive speeches, intended to put forth the arguments which will comprise the issues in dispute.  A cross-examination period of three minutes follows each of these speeches in order to clarify arguments and gain information relevant to each competitor's position.  Each competitor is then given a six-minute rebuttal in which their responses and development of the arguments are finalized.  At the end of the round, the affirmative is given one final three-minute speech to review why their plan ought to be passed in support of the resolution.  An assigned judge will then cast a ballot to affirm or negate the resolution.

Past LD National Championship Teams
1971 - Ohio University
1972 - Ball State University
1973 - Eastern Michigan University
1974 - Ohio University
1975 - Ohio University
1976 - Eastern Michigan University
1977 - Eastern Michigan University
1978 - Eastern Michigan University
1979 - Eastern Michigan University
1980 - Eastern Michigan University
1981 - Eastern Michigan University
1982 - Bradley University
1983 - Bradley University
1984 - Bradley University
1985 - Bradley University
1986 - Eastern Michigan University
1987 - Eastern Michigan University
1988 - Bradley University
1989 - Bradley University
1990 - Bradley University
1991 - Wayne State University
1992 - University of Wisconsin-Eau Claire
1993 - Western Kentucky University
1994 - Bradley University
1995 - Illinois State University
1996 - Western Kentucky University
1997 - Ohio State University
1998 - Western Kentucky University
1999 - Western Kentucky University
2000 - Central Missouri State University
2001 - St. Anselm College
2002 - University of Pennsylvania
2003 - Missouri Southern State University
2004 - Creighton University
2005 - University of Missouri-Columbia
2006 - University of Missouri-Columbia
2007 - Creighton University
2008 - Drury University
2009 - Creighton University
2010 - Western Kentucky University
2011 - Western Kentucky University
2012 - Drury University
2013 - Western Kentucky University
2014 - Western Kentucky University
2015 - Western Kentucky University
2016 - Kansas City Kansas Community College
2017 - Western Kentucky University
Years 1991 - 2017 verified

Members of the NFA Hall of Fame
Induction Class: Era: Name: College/University
April 2000 1970-1975 David Beal Ohio University
April 2000 1970-1975 Greg Denaro Southern Connecticut State University
April 2000 1970-1975 Jim Molnar Ohio University
April 2000 1970-1975 Judy Sturgis Hill Eastern Michigan University
April 2000 1970-1975 Danny Vice Eastern Michigan University
April 2000 1976-1980 Jon Capecci Eastern Michigan University
April 2000 1976-1980 Michael Garcia Eastern Michigan University
April 2000 1976-1980 Theresa McElwee Eastern Michigan University
April 2000 1976-1980 Donald Smith Southern Connecticut State University
April 2000 1976-1980 Elighie Wilson Ball State University
April 2000 1981-1985 Marco Benassi Bradley University
April 2000 1981-1985 Greg Dolph Bradley University
April 2000 1981-1985 Sam Marcosson Bradley University
April 2000 1986-1990 David Bickford Brown University
April 2000 1986-1990 Sarah Braun Bradley University
April 2000 1986-1990 Cam Jones Cornell University
April 2000 1986-1990 Stephanie Kaplan University of Wisconsin-Madison
April 2000 1986-1990 Kim Roe Eastern Michigan University
April 2000 1991-1995 Jason Berke Illinois State University
April 2000 1991-1995 Karon Bowers Bradley University
April 2000 1991-1995 George LaMaster Bradley University
April 2000 1991-1995 Kevin Minch Wayne State University
April 2000 1991-1995 Patrick O'Shaughnessy Bradley University
April 2000 1996-2000 August Benassi Bradley University
April 2000 1996-2000 Brian Davis Arizona State University
April 2000 1996-2000 Matt MacDonald Bradley University
April 2000 1996-2000 Jill Valentine Bradley University
April 2001 1996-2000 Ben Lohman Bradley University
April 2001 1996-2000 Chris Grove Illinois State University
April 2001 1991-1995 Stacy Nekula Illinois State University
April 2001 1991-1995 Mona Dworzak Illinois State University
April 2001 1986-1990 Celeste Devore Matheson Illinois State University
April 2001 1976-1980 William Allen Young University of Southern California
April 2001 1976-1980 Nancy Cartwright  Ohio University
April 2001 1976-1980 Mark Hickman Marshall University
April 2002 1970-1975 Keith Semmel Mansfield State College
April 2002 1970-1975 Paul Van Dyne Penn State University
April 2002 1976-1980 Christina Collier Reynolds Bowling Green State University/Ohio University
April 2002 1981-1985 J.G. Harrington Rutgers University
April 2002 1986-1990 Penny Geurink O'Connor University of Northern Iowa
April 2002 1986-1990 Joel Schwartzberg Emerson College
April 2002 1991-1995 Andrew Billings Indiana University
April 2002 1991-1995 Adam Black Western Kentucky University
April 2002 1991-1995 Michael Malloy Saint Joseph's University
April 2002 1991-1995 Andy Wood St. Petersburg JC/Berry College
April 2002 1996-2000 Brendan Kelly Eastern Michigan University
April 2002 1996-2000 David Lindrum Berry College
April 2002 1996-2000 Robert Pieranunzi Indiana University
April 2003 1986-1990 Liesel Reinhart University of Colorado
April 2003 1976-1980 Kenda Creasey Dean Miami University
April 2006  1976-1980 Ray Quiel  Eastern Michigan University 
April 2006  1981-1985 Mitchell "Bucky" Fay  University of Wisconsin-Eau Claire 
April 2006  1986-1990 Ken Klawitter  Bradley University 
April 2006  1991-1995 Rita Rahoi  University of Wisconsin-Eau Claire
April 2008 1981-1985 Tom Doyle Bradley University
April 2008 1996-2000 Jason Davidson Bradley University
April 2008 1996-2000 Sarah Meinen Jedd Bradley University
April 2009 1996-2000 Jaime Riewerts Bradley University
April 2009 2001-2005 Aaron Unseth University of Wisconsin-Eau Claire
April 2010 1975-1979 Meg Langford George Mason University
April 2010 2001-2005 John Coleman Berry College
April 2010 2001-2005 Rob Barnhart Ohio University
April 2010 2001-2005 Erin Gallagher Barnhart Ohio University
April 2011 1991-1995 Jeff "Shappy" Seasholtz Eastern Michigan University
April 2014 1991-1995 Jeff Archibald Cornell University
April 2014 1996-2000 Kelly (Lloyd) Adriani Eastern Michigan University
April 2014 1996-2000 Ryan Hershberger Eastern Michigan University
April 2014 2001-2005 Nina Brennan Eastern Michigan University
April 2014 2001-2005 Amber (Neuenschwander) Price Eastern Michigan University
April 2014 2006-2010 Robert Cannon Glendale Community College - CA

External links
Official website

References

Educational organizations based in the United States